Juan Solari is a British TV and film director and producer, actor, voice over artist and video journalist of Mexican origin.

Career

Juan Solari worked in Mexico City, from around 1984 to 1999. During this time, he performed in theatre and directed several television series and television advertisements.

In late 1999, he moved to London and in 2003 he completed a MA in AudioVisual Production (as a Film Director) at London Metropolitan University with his short film, the thriller Marionettes. 

Shortly after, he founded Solar Dreams Productions Ltd. an independent TV and films production company in the UK.

After being invited by the Universities of Cambridge and Southampton, Solari taught two film-making seminars at these institutions.

In 2006, he was nominated by the Foreign Press Association in London for a "Story of the Year" award for his documentary Iran, Behind the Door Line.

In 2014 he directed the rehearsed reading of the award-winning theatre play Musica de Balas at Time Out best fringe venue in London, the White Bear Theatre.

He is currently a Senior Lecturer and Course Director for the BA Journalism at the School of Media & Creative Industries of London South Bank University.

See also
List of Mexican British people

References

External links
Juan Solari web page
IMDb listing

Year of birth missing (living people)
Living people
Mexican male actors
Mexican film directors
People from Mexico City
Mexican emigrants to the United Kingdom